Tebrau or Teberau is a mukim and a town in Johor Bahru District, Johor, Malaysia. It is the third largest mukim in the district.

Administrative area
Bandar Dato' Onn
Adda Heights
Taman Delima
Taman Daya
Taman Setia Indah
Taman Mount Austin
Taman Desa Tebrau
Taman Desa Jaya
Taman Desa Cemerlang
Taman Ehsan Jaya
Taman Istimewa
Taman Bukit Mutiara
Taman Desa Mutiara
 Taman Seri Austin
 Taman Ekoflora

Villages
Kampung Kangkar Tebrau
Kampung Pandan, Johor Bahru
Ulu Tiram
Kempas Baru
Tampoi

Transportation
The mukim is accessible by Causeway Link route 6B from Johor Bahru Sentral railway station.

References

External links
 

Towns in Johor
Mukims of Johor Bahru District